Artannes-sur-Indre (literally Artannes on Indre) is a commune in the Indre-et-Loire department in central France.

Population

Town twinning
 Bathford, Somerset, Great Britain

See also
Communes of the Indre-et-Loire department

References

Communes of Indre-et-Loire